Neocolpodes subimpressus is a species of beetle from the family Carabidae. The scientific name of this species was first published in 1897 by Allaud.

References

Beetles described in 1897
Platyninae